Play the Game Right is the debut album by Ziggy Marley and the Melody Makers, released in 1985. The album was executive produced by Rita Marley.

The album was nominated for a Grammy.

Critical reception
AllMusic called Play the Game Right "an excellent album, and a formidable debut," praising the "clean sound that balances a rootsy feel with a lilting poppy edge." Trouser Press called it "attractive and surprisingly accomplished for such young musicians."

Track listing
All tracks composed by David "Ziggy" Marley; except where indicated
"Naah Leggo"
"What a Plot"
"Play the Game Right"
"Aiding and Abetting"
"Revelation" (Ziggy Marley, Richard Booker)
"Children Playing in the Streets" (Bob Marley)
"Reggae Is Now" (Live)
"Unuh Nuh Listen Yet" (Ziggy Marley, Constantine "Vision" Walker)
"Rising Sun"
"Natty Dread Rampage"

Personnel
Ziggy Marley - vocals, guitar, percussion
Chinna, Richard Walters, Steve Golding - acoustic guitar
Aston Barrett, Owen "Dreadie" Reid, Richard Walter - bass
Ashley "Grub" Cooper, Carlton Barrett - drums
Ashley "Grub" Cooper, Harry "T" Powell, Steve Golding, Sticky - percussion
"Wire" Lindo, Tyrone Downie - piano, organ
Ashey "Grub" Cooper, Dean Fraser, Glen DaCosta - saxophone
David Madden, Junior "Chico" Chin, Seymour Powell - trumpet
Calvin "Bubbles" Cameron, Everald Gayle, Ronald "Nambo" Robinson - trombone
Cedella Marley, Sharon Marley, Stephen Marley - backing vocals
Technical
Rita Marley - executive producer
Errol Brown, Scientist - engineers

References

1985 debut albums
Ziggy Marley and the Melody Makers albums
EMI Records albums